Yutian (Chinese: 玉田; Pinyin: yùtián) is a town under the administration of Changle District, Fuzhou, Fujian, China. As of 2018, the town has a population of 43,358 within its 54.7 squared kilometers area.

Administrative Divisions 
There are 11 villages under the town, they are listed as follows:

 Yutian
 Taoyuan
 Xipu
 Xishe
 Changqing
 Daxi
 Qianzhong
 Langqi
 Langfeng
 Kentian
 Dongdu

References 

Populated places in Fujian
Fuzhou